This is a list of all electric locomotives that have been or are being operated by Indian Railways.

Classification 
Locomotives were classified by track gauge, motive power, function and power (or model number) in a four- or five-letter code. The first letter denotes the track gauge. The second letter denotes motive power (diesel or electric), and the third letter denotes use (goods, passenger, mixed or shunting). The fourth letter denotes a locomotive's chronological model number.

In 2002, a new classification system was adopted. For newer diesel locomotives, the fourth letter denotes their horsepower range. Not all diesel locomotives were reclassified, and the fourth letter continues to denotes their model number.

A locomotive may have a fifth letter, generally denoting a technical variant, subclass or subtype: a variation in the basic model or series, or a different motor or manufacturer. Under the new system, the fifth letter further refines horsepower in 100-hp increments: A for 100 hp, B for 200 hp, C for 300 hp and so on.

The system does not apply to steam locomotives, which are no longer used on main lines. They retain their original class names, such as M- or WP-class.

Nomenclature 

 First letter (gauge):
 W – Broad gauge (wide) – 
 Y – Metre gauge (yard) – 
 Z –  narrow gauge
 N –  narrow (toy) gauge
 Second letter (motive power):
 D – Diesel
 C – DC electric (DC overhead line)
 A – AC electric (AC overhead line)
 CA – DC and AC (AC or DC overhead line); CA is considered one letter
 B – Battery (rare)
 Third letter (usage):
 G – Goods
 P – Passenger
 M – Mixed (goods and passenger)
 S – Shunting (switching)
 U – Multiple unit (electric or diesel)
 R – Railcar

In WCM-4, W denotes broad gauge; C denotes DC Electric power; M denotes mixed use (goods and passenger service), and 4 denotes fourth Generation. In WAP 5, W is broad gauge; A is AC electric; P is passenger service, and 5 indicates that the locomotive is the fifth model used.

Broad-gauge locomotives 
Broad-gauge electric classification codes are:

 WAM - Wide AC electric mixed
 WAP - Wide AC electric passenger
 WAG - Wide AC electric goods
 WCM - Wide DC electric mixed
 WCP - Wide DC electric passenger
 WCG - Wide DC electric goods
 WCAM - Wide AC/DC electric mixed
 WCAG - Wide AC/DC electric goods
 WCAS - Wide AC/DC electric shunter

AC mixed class (WAM Series)

AC passenger class (WAP series)

AC goods class (WAG series)

DC mixed class (WCM series)

DC passenger class (WCP series)

DC goods class (WCG series)

Dual current (DC and AC) mixed class (WCAM Series)

Dual current (DC and AC) goods class (WCAG Series)

Metre-gauge locomotives 
Metre-gauge electric classification codes are:

 YAM – Metre gauge AC electric mixed
 YCG – Metre gauge DC electric goods

AC mixed class (YAM Series)

DC goods class (YCG series)

See also

 List of diesel locomotives of India
 Locomotives of India
 Rail transport in India

References

Notes

Bibliography

 Databook of Electric Locomotives published by RDSO, archive link

Databook of Electric locomotives May 2016

 
Railway locomotive-related lists
5 ft 6 in gauge locomotives
Indian railway-related lists